Mehnatobod is a town and jamoat in north-western Tajikistan. It is located in Zafarobod District in Sughd Region. The town has a total population of 12,400 (2020).

References

Populated places in Sughd Region
Jamoats of Tajikistan